Samuel Thomas Britton (June 29, 1933 – October 10, 2011) was a former member of the Ohio House of Representatives.  He represented a Cincinnati, Ohio area district from 1995 to 2002.  He was succeeded by Tyrone Yates.

References

2011 deaths
Members of the Ohio House of Representatives
1933 births
21st-century American politicians